Sven Yngve Persson (born 1960 in Hasslarp) is a Swedish politician of the Moderate Party. He has been a member of the Riksdag since 2006 and a replacement member of the Riksdag in 2006.

External links
Riksdagen: Sven Yngve Persson (m) 

Members of the Riksdag from the Moderate Party
Members of the Riksdag 2006–2010
Living people
1960 births
People from Helsingborg Municipality
Date of birth missing (living people)